The Oirata–Makasai, or Eastern Timor, languages are a small family of Papuan languages spoken in eastern Timor and the neighboring island of Kisar.

Languages
Mandala et al. (2011) found that Fataluku and Oirata are closer to each other than they are to Makasai:

Makasai (including Makalero dialect)
Oirata–Fataluku
Fataluku (Rusenu perhaps belongs here)
Oirata

Fataluku has high dialect diversity, and may be more than a single language, for example with Rusenu. An additional Makuv'a (Lovaea) branch was once assumed for East Timor, but that appears to be a heavily Papuan-influenced Austronesian language.

The fourth Papuan language spoken in East Timor, Bunak, is more distantly related.  It is currently unknown if they are closer to each other or to the Alor–Pantar languages; all are clearly related.  They may be closest to the West Bomberai languages of mainland New Guinea, but this is as yet speculative.

Classification
Ross (2005) reconstructed first- and second-person pronouns for proto–East Timor:

{| class=wikitable
! !!proto-ET!!Oirata (object)!!Fataluku!!Makasai
|-
!1sg 
|*ani||an-te (ani)||ani||ani
|-
!2sg 
|*ai||aa-te/ee-te (ee)||e||ai
|-
!1ex 
|*ini||in-te (in)||ini||ini
|-
!1in 
|*api||ap-te (ap)||afi||fi
|-
!2pl 
|*i||ii-te (ii)||i||i
|}

Mandala et al. (2011) reconstruct five vowels, *a, *e, *i, *o, *u, and the following consonants, based on 200 cognate sets:

{| class="wikitable"
! 
!Labial
!Alveolar
!Velar
!Glottal
|- align="center"
! Nasal
|   
| 
|
|
|- align="center"
! Occlusive
|   
| 
| 
| 
|- align="center"
! Fricative
|   
| 
|
| 
|- align="center"
! Sonorant
|  
| 
|
|
|}

*h and *j appear at the level of proto-Oirata–Fataluku.

External links 
 Timothy Usher, New Guinea World, Proto–East Timor

References

 
Timor–Alor–Pantar languages
Languages of East Timor